Dariusz Rzeźniczek  (born 22 May 1968 in Chorzów) is a retired Polish professional footballer who played for GKS Katowice and GKS Bełchatów in the Polish Ekstraklasa.

Club career
Rzeźniczek began his professional career with GKS Katowice, and played in 110 Ekstraklasa league matches over eight seasons. Following the 1993-94 season, he moved to GKS Bełchatów where he spent the next six seasons and made another 80 Ekstraklasa league appearances.

International career
Rzeźniczek made two appearances for the Poland national football team, his debut coming in a friendly match against Cyprus on 27 August 1996.

References

External links
 

1968 births
Living people
Polish footballers
Poland international footballers
GKS Katowice players
Śląsk Wrocław players
GKS Bełchatów players
Stal Stalowa Wola players
Sportspeople from Chorzów
Association football midfielders